Henry Mason (1831–1890) was one of the co-founders of the American piano manufacturer Mason and Hamlin.

He was the son of American church music composer Lowell Mason, and the brother of composer William Mason.

Notes

1831 births
1890 deaths
19th-century American businesspeople